Charles James Munnerlyn (February 14, 1822 – May 17, 1898) was an American politician and military officer who served in the Confederate States of America. He served in the Confederate congress and commanded the First Battalion, Florida Special Cavalry.

Early life
Munnerlyn was born in Georgetown, South Carolina and later moved to Decatur County, Georgia. He was educated at Emory College and studied law under judge Augustus Baldwin Longstreet, the uncle of James Longstreet.

Civil War
He attended the Secession Convention and signed the Ordinance of Secession before he served in the Confederate Army. He represented Georgia in the First Confederate Congress from 1862 to 1864. In 1864, he was ordered to Florida and organized the Cow Cavalry. With John T. Lesley and James McKay, he assisted in the escape of Judah Benjamin.

References

External links
 Charles James Munnerlyn 1822-1898 historical marker
 Refuge historical marker

1822 births
1898 deaths
Confederate States Army officers
People from Georgetown County, South Carolina
Members of the Confederate House of Representatives from Georgia (U.S. state)
19th-century American politicians
People from Decatur County, Georgia
People of Georgia (U.S. state) in the American Civil War